The following lists events that happened during 1950 in Laos.

Incumbents
Monarch: Sisavang Vong 
Prime Minister: Boun Oum (until 24 February), Phoui Sananikone (starting 24 February)

Events

August
16 August - Prince Souphanouvong joins the Viet Minh in Hanoi and becomes the leader of the Pathet Lao.

References

 
1950s in Laos
Years of the 20th century in Laos
Laos
Laos